Mikie Tasei (born 17 January 1980) is a Japanese table tennis player. Her highest career ITTF ranking was 36.

References

1980 births
Living people
Japanese female table tennis players